Church of the Cross is a Lutheran church in Riga, the capital of Latvia. It is a parish church of the Evangelical Lutheran Church of Latvia. The church is situated at the address 120 Ropažu Street.

References

External links
Church website (in Latvian)

Churches in Riga
Art Nouveau architecture in Riga
Art Nouveau church buildings